Taarak Mehta Ka Chhota Chashmah is an Indian animated television series based on Taarak Mehta Ka Ooltah Chashmah. It had aired on Sony Yay on 19 April 2021. It is also available on Netflix.

Plot 
It is based on Taarak Mehta Ka Ooltah Chashmah, a Hindi sitcom based on the weekly column "Duniya Ne Undha Chasma" by Taarak Mehta in Chitralekha magazine. It is produced by Asit Kumarr Modi.

The series revolves around the adventures of Tapu and The Gokuldham Society, and if something wrong happens, Tapu and his friends solve the problems.

Voice cast
Rajesh Kava as Jethalal "Jethiya" Champaklal Gada
Bhoomika Jain as Daya Jethalal Gada (Jethalal's wife, Tapu's mother & Champaklal's daughter-in-law)
Aditya Pednekar as Tipendra "Tapu" Jethalal Gada (Jethalal & Daya's son & Champaklal's grandson)
Amit Bhatt as Champaklal Jayantilal Gada (Jethalal's father, Daya's father-in-law & Tapu's grandfather)
Shatrughan Sharma as Taarak Mehta
Neha Nigam as Anjali Taarak Mehta (Taarak's wife)
Mayur Yadav as Roshan Singh Harjeet Singh Sodhi & Patrakaar Popatlal Bhagwatiprasad Pandey
Saudamini as  Roshan Kaur Sodhi (Sodhi's wife) & Babita Krishnan Iyer (Iyer's wife)
Pranoy Roy as Gurcharan "Gogi" Singh Roshan Singh Sodhi (Sodhi & Roshan's son)
Sachin Suresh as Aatmaram Tukaram Bhide
Meeta Savarkar as Madhavi Aatmaram Bhide (Aatmaram's wife & Sonu's mother)
Diya Shintre as Sonalika "Sonu" Aatmaram Bhide (Bhide & Madhavi's daughter)
Sunil Tiwari as Dr. Hansraj Baldevraj Hathi
Shailey Dubey Rao as Gulabkumar "Goli" Hansraj Hathi (Hathi's son)
Arvind Koli as Krishnan Subramaniam Iyer
Dev Singhal as Pankaj "Pinku" Diwan Sahay
Hitesh Upadhyay as Natwarlal Prabhashankar Udhaiwala a.k.a. Nattu Kaka
Mohit Sinha as Bagheshwar "Bagha" Dadukh Udhaiwala (Nattu's nephew)

Television film
A television film Tapu and the Big Fat Alien Wedding aired on 27 May 2022 on Sony Yay.

References

External links
 

Indian animated television series
Sony Yay original programming
2021 Indian television series debuts
Indian television spin-offs
Indian comedy television series